The 2018 IFAGG World Cup series in Aesthetic Group Gymnastics is a series of competitions officially organized and promoted by the International Federation of Aesthetic Group Gymnastics.

Formats

Medal winners

World Cup

Challenge Cup

Final ranking

World Cup

Note: Only three best results count.

Overall medal table

See also
 2018 World Aesthetic Group Gymnastics Championships

References

External links
Official Site

Aesthetic Group Gymnastics World Cup
2018 in gymnastics